The Atlanta Boy Choir is a renowned choral group for boys and men in Atlanta, Georgia. The choir, as it is known today, was founded in 1959 by Maestro Fletcher Wolfe and his wife Roberta Kahne Wolfe.  The choir is an ambassador internationally, performing across North America and Europe in many of the most renowned concert halls and cathedrals in the world.

The choir has sung for Pope John Paul II at the Vatican City five times. In 2006, the choir returned to Italy where it performed for Pope Benedict XVI in the Sistine Chapel of St. Peter's Basilica. In 1966, the choir marked its Carnegie Hall debut.  In 1989, the choir won a Grammy Award for its performance and recording of Britten’s [War Requiem] with the Atlanta Symphony Orchestra.  The choir has been featured on television, radio, and participated in solos and backups on various recordings such as  The Power & The Majesty: Essential Choral Classics (1995) with conductor  Robert Shaw and  Classics for All Seasons (1994) with various composers/conductors. In 2009, the choir sang at Vienna's Musikverein during the International Haydn Festival commemorating the 200th anniversary of the death of Austrian composer, Joseph Haydn.  In 2016, the choir was featured and sang in Marvel's Captain America: Civil War.

Other notable places where the choir has performed include St. Peter's Basilica in Rome, the White House in Washington, DC, St. Paul's Cathedral in London, Notre Dame Cathedral in Paris, the Kennedy Center in Washington DC, the Great Hall of the Philharmonic in St. Petersburg, and Westminster Abbey in London.

History

In 1946, the Atlanta Boy Choir was founded as part of the music program for the Atlanta City School System in 1946.  That early boy choir gave annual concerts locally and was composed of boys with unchanged voices.  In 1953, another boy choir, known as the Atlanta Boy Choir was founded by George Crawford.  That choir met at a local church.  When Mr. Crawford relocated to Alabama, parents of the members of that early choir formed a new choir and chose Fletcher Wolfe as the founding director.  That choir was legally incorporated as the Atlanta Boy Choir, Inc., in November 1959.

Fletcher Wolfe continued to conduct the choir until the fall of 2001 when he retired and David White was hired to replace him. Maestro White continued the choir's collaborations with the Atlanta Symphony Orchestra and other area arts organizations and led the choir on tours of Russia and Austria. However, controversy arose between the conductor and the board of directors who felt that White was obligating the choir financially without board approval. The board agreed to raise $50,000 but only managed to raise $10,000 and was forced to take out a loan on the choirs Ponce De Leon Avenue mansion. https://www.ajc.com/entertainment/music/conductor-firing-sparks-rift-atlanta-boy-choir/NSWt9QWcrl8paaR2mu9RII/
In the summer of 2009, the board of directors dismissed Mr. White.  Fletcher Wolfe was then asked by the Board of Directors to return and lead the Atlanta Boy Choir once again.

Repertoire

In more than 50 years, the Atlanta Boy Choir established a reputation for being one of the world's finest boy choirs and was become known for its diversity of members and broad repertoire which includes choral masterworks of early composers such as Giovanni Pierluigi da Palestrina and Claudio Monteverdi, and the contemporary masterworks of such composers as Benjamin Britten and Krzysztof Penderecki. The choir has collaborated numerous times with the Atlanta Symphony Orchestra, and with conductors Robert Shaw and Yoel Levi.

Performances and concert tours

According to the Boy Choir & Soloist Directory, the choir notably appeared before presidents, popes, foreign dignitaries, crowned heads of state, and U.S. soldiers. in 1961, the choir performed at the Palacio de Bellas Artes with the National Symphony Orchestra (Mexico) preceding the visit of newly elected U.S. President, John F. Kennedy. In 2004, the Atlanta Boy Choir toured Greece as part of the 2004 Cultural Olympiad before the 2004 Summer Olympics in Athens. the choir has also visited England, Scotland, Wales, France, Germany, Italy, Switzerland, Austria, Belgium, Spain, Morocco, Hungary, Yugoslavia, Czechoslovakia, Finland, Russia, Portugal, Yugoslavia, Czechoslovakia, Canada, and Mexico.

Recordings

In 1989, the choir won a Grammy Award for its performance and recording of Britten’s [War Requiem] with the Atlanta Symphony Orchestra.  The choir has been featured on television, radio, and participated in solos and backups on various recordings such as  The Power & The Majesty: Essential Choral Classics (1995) with conductor  Robert Shaw and  Classics for All Seasons (1994) with various composers/conductors.

Recent years: 2009-Current

Fletcher Wolfe returned as conductor of the Atlanta Boy Choir, and the boy choir and the men's choir completed a concert tour of Italy. They performed Sunday Mass at St. Peter's Basilica in the Vatican City and gave performances at the Basilica of St. Francis in Assisi and Siena Cathedral in Siena.  In 2011, the choir took a tour to Alaska. In 2012, the boy choir toured to Russia where it performed at the Great Hall of the Philharmonic and the Winter Palace.  During the summer of 2013, the choir took a tour of Nova Scotia in Canada. The Choir was invited to concertize in Poland and The Czech Republic in 2014. In 2016, the choir was featured and sang in Marvel's Captain America: Civil War Following the Summer Tour to Nova Scotia in the summer of 2017, it was announced that the founding director would be retiring, for the final time. After a few months, Dr. Robert Henry took the position as director of the Atlanta Boy Choir, preserving its legacy. In 2018, the choir sold their property on Ponce de Leon Ave in Atlanta and are currently relocating to new facilities. The Atlanta Boy Choir is in its 62nd year.

References

External links
Atlanta Boy Choir Official Site

Choirs in Georgia (U.S. state)
Musical groups established in 1946
Boys' and men's choirs
Musical groups from Atlanta